The Novikov self-consistency principle, also known as the Novikov self-consistency conjecture and Larry Niven's law of conservation of history, is a principle developed by Russian physicist Igor Dmitriyevich Novikov in the mid-1980s. Novikov intended it to solve the problem of paradoxes in time travel, which is theoretically permitted in certain solutions of general relativity that contain what are known as closed timelike curves. The principle asserts that if an event exists that would cause a paradox or any "change" to the past whatsoever, then the probability of that event is zero. It would thus be impossible to create time paradoxes.

History
Physicists have long known that some solutions to the theory of general relativity contain closed timelike curves—for example the Gödel metric. Novikov discussed the possibility of closed timelike curves (CTCs) in books he wrote in 1975 and 1983, offering the opinion that only self-consistent trips back in time would be permitted. In a 1990 paper by Novikov and several others, "Cauchy problem in spacetimes with closed timelike curves", the authors state:

Among the co-authors of this 1990 paper were Kip Thorne, Mike Morris, and Ulvi Yurtsever, who in 1988 had stirred up renewed interest in the subject of time travel in general relativity with their paper "Wormholes, Time Machines, and the Weak Energy Condition", which showed that a new general relativity solution known as a traversable wormhole could lead to closed timelike curves, and unlike previous CTC-containing solutions, it did not require unrealistic conditions for the universe as a whole. After discussions with the lead author of the 1990 paper, John Friedman, they convinced themselves that time travel need not lead to unresolvable paradoxes, regardless of the object sent through the wormhole.

 
By way of response, physicist Joseph Polchinski wrote them a letter arguing that one could avoid the issue of free will by employing a potentially paradoxical thought experiment involving a billiard ball sent back in time through a wormhole. In Polchinski's scenario, the billiard ball is fired into the wormhole at an angle such that, if it continues along its path, it will exit in the past at just the right angle to collide with its earlier self, knocking it off track and preventing it from entering the wormhole in the first place. Thorne would refer to this scenario as "Polchinski's paradox" in 1994.

Upon considering the scenario, Fernando Echeverria and Gunnar Klinkhammer, two students at Caltech (where Thorne taught), arrived at a solution to the problem that managed to avoid any inconsistencies. In the revised scenario, the ball from the future emerges at a different angle than the one that generates the paradox, and delivers its younger self a glancing blow instead of knocking it completely away from the wormhole. This blow alters its trajectory by just the right degree, meaning it will travel back in time with the angle required to deliver its younger self the necessary glancing blow. Echeverria and Klinkhammer actually found that there was more than one self-consistent solution, with slightly different angles for the glancing blow in each situation. Later analysis by Thorne and Robert Forward illustrated that for certain initial trajectories of the billiard ball, there could actually be an infinite number of self-consistent solutions.

Echeverria, Klinkhammer, and Thorne published a paper discussing these results in 1991; in addition, they reported that they had tried to see if they could find any initial conditions for the billiard ball for which there were no self-consistent extensions, but were unable to do so. Thus, it is plausible that there exist self-consistent extensions for every possible initial trajectory, although this has not been proven. This only applies to initial conditions outside of the chronology-violating region of spacetime, which is bounded by a Cauchy horizon. This could mean that the Novikov self-consistency principle does not actually place any constraints on systems outside of the region of space-time where time travel is possible, only inside it.

Even if self-consistent extensions can be found for arbitrary initial conditions outside the Cauchy horizon, the finding that there can be multiple distinct self-consistent extensions for the same initial condition—indeed, Echeverria et al. found an infinite number of consistent extensions for every initial trajectory they analyzed—can be seen as problematic, since classically there seems to be no way to decide which extension the laws of physics will choose. To get around this difficulty, Thorne and Klinkhammer analyzed the billiard ball scenario using quantum mechanics, performing a quantum-mechanical sum over histories (path integral) using only the consistent extensions, and found that this resulted in a well-defined probability for each consistent extension. The authors of "Cauchy problem in spacetimes with closed timelike curves" write:

Assumptions
The Novikov consistency principle assumes certain conditions about what sort of time travel is possible. Specifically, it assumes either that there is only one timeline, or that any alternative timelines (such as those postulated by the many-worlds interpretation of quantum mechanics) are not accessible.

Given these assumptions, the constraint that time travel must not lead to inconsistent outcomes could be seen merely as a tautology, a self-evident truth that cannot possibly be false. However, the Novikov self-consistency principle is intended to go beyond just the statement that history must be consistent, making the additional nontrivial assumption that the universe obeys the same local laws of physics in situations involving time travel that it does in regions of space-time that lack closed timelike curves. This is clarified in the above-mentioned "Cauchy problem in spacetimes with closed timelike curves", where the authors write:

Implications for time travelers
The assumptions of the self-consistency principle can be extended to hypothetical scenarios involving intelligent time travelers as well as unintelligent objects such as billiard balls. The authors of "Cauchy problem in spacetimes with closed timelike curves" commented on the issue in the paper's conclusion, writing:

Similarly, physicist and astronomer J. Craig Wheeler concludes that:

Time-loop logic

Time-loop logic, coined by roboticist and futurist Hans Moravec, is a hypothetical system of computation that exploits the Novikov self-consistency principle to compute answers much faster than possible with the standard model of computational complexity using Turing machines. In this system, a computer sends a result of a computation backwards through time and relies upon the self-consistency principle to force the sent result to be correct, provided the machine can reliably receive information from the future and provided the algorithm and the underlying mechanism are formally correct. An incorrect result or no result can still be produced if the time travel mechanism or algorithm are not guaranteed to be accurate.

A simple example is an iterative method algorithm. Moravec states:

Quantum computation with a negative delay

Physicist David Deutsch showed in 1991 that this model of computation could solve NP problems in polynomial time, and Scott Aaronson later extended this result to show that the model could also be used to solve PSPACE problems in polynomial time. Deutsch shows that quantum computation with a negative delay—backwards time travel—produces only self-consistent solutions, and the chronology-violating region imposes constraints that are not apparent through classical reasoning. Researchers published in 2014 a simulation in which they claim to have validated Deutsch's model with photons. However, it was shown in an article by Tolksdorf and Verch that Deutsch's self-consistency condition can be fulfilled to arbitrary precision in any quantum system described according to relativistic quantum field theory even on spacetimes which do not admit closed timelike curves, casting doubts on whether Deutsch's model is really characteristic of quantum processes simulating closed timelike curves in the sense of general relativity.
In a later article,
the same authors show that Deutsch's CTC fixed point condition can also be fulfilled in any system
subject to the laws of classical statistical mechanics, even if it is not built up by quantum systems. The authors conclude that hence, 
Deutsch's condition is not specific to quantum physics, nor does it depend on the quantum nature of a physical system so that it can be fulfilled.
In consequence, Tolksdorf and Verch argue that Deutsch's condition is not sufficiently specific to allow statements about time travel scenarios or their hypothetical realization by quantum physics.

Lloyd's prescription 
An alternative proposal was later presented by Seth Lloyd based upon post-selection and path integrals. In particular, the path integral is over single-valued fields, leading to self-consistent histories.

In popular culture 
 The Final Countdown (1980): A science-fiction time-travel movie in which the aircraft carrier, USS Nimitz, passes through a wormhole back to the eve of the Pearl Harbor. The anomaly returns and sends it back into the present, before it has a chance to affect the outcome.
 The story The Merchant and the Alchemist's Gate (2007) by Ted Chiang explores the interplay between free will and self-consistent time-travel
 Steins;Gate (2009): Cited by Makise Kurisu during her presentation on time travel.
 Harry Potter and the Methods of Rationality: In Eliezer Yudkowsky's exposition on rationality, framed as a piece of Harry Potter fanfiction, Harry attempts to use his Time Turner to influence the past and comes to the conclusion that the Novikov self-consistency principle applies.
 Orthogonal: A science-fiction novel series that applies the principle.
 The Netflix series Dark is largely based on the notion that the possibility of time travel tempts the characters to try change the past, which only leads them to cause the events they were trying to prevent in the first place.
 Outer Wilds (2019): A video game involving time travel which does not follow the principle, causing a game over if the player experiments to test it.

See also 
 Causal loop
 Causality (physics)
 Chronology protection conjecture
 Cosmic censorship hypothesis
 The chicken or the egg
 Many-worlds interpretation
 Grandfather paradox
 Quantum mechanics of time travel
 Time viewer

References

External links
 Notion of the Past & Can We Change It? – speech by Novikov
 From wormhole to time machine: Comments on Hawking's Chronology Protection Conjecture, which also addresses the Novikov self-consistency principle
 Einstein Physics prevent paradoxical time travel
 Time Travel and Modern Physics

Time travel
Conjectures
Temporal paradoxes